Jeanne-Charlotte Schroeder, also known as Madame Saint-Aubin, (9 December 1764 – 11 September 1850), was a French opera singer who sang leading soprano roles with the Comédie-Italienne and the Opéra-Comique. In 1782, she married the actor and singer Augustin-Alexandre Saint-Aubin (1754-1818). The couple's four children were also musicians. Jean-Denis Saint-Auban (1783–c.1810) was a violinist and composer. Louis-Philibert Saint-Aubin (1784-1846) was a professor at the Paris Conservatory. Cécile Saint-Aubin (1785-1862) and Alexandrine Saint-Aubin (1793-1867) were both opera singers.

References

18th-century French women opera singers
French operatic sopranos
1764 births
1850 deaths
19th-century French women opera singers